Hibbertia crispula, commonly known as Ooldea guinea flower, is a species of flowering plant in the family Dilleniaceae and is native to disjunct locations in Western Australia and South Australia. It is a small, wiry, glabrous shrub with needle-shaped leaves and yellow flowers with twenty-five to thirty-five stamens arranged around three glabrous carpels.

Description
There are twenty-five to thirty-five stamens arranged around the three glabrous carpels, each containing four or five ovules.

Taxonomy
Hibbertia crispula was first formally described in 1917 by John McConnell Black in the Transactions and Proceedings of the Royal Society of South Australia from specimens collected by Samuel Albert White near Ooldea in the same year. The specific epithet (crispula) means "curled" or "crinkled".

Distribution
Ooldea guinea flower is only known from near Ooldea and near Yellabinna Regional Reserve in South Australia and from the Great Victoria Desert in Western Australia.

Conservation status
Hibbertia crispula is classified as "vulnerable" under the Australian Government Environment Protection and Biodiversity Conservation Act 1999 and as "Priority One" by the Government of Western Australia Department of Parks and Wildlife, meaning that it is known from only one or a few locations which are potentially at risk. The main threats to the species include weed invasion, grazing by feral animals and habitat fragmentation.

See also
List of Hibbertia species

References

crispula
Flora of Western Australia
Plants described in 1917
Taxa named by John McConnell Black